Luzhsky Uyezd was one of the eight subdivisions of the Saint Petersburg Governorate of the Russian Empire. Its capital was Luga. Luzhsky Uyezd was located in the southwestern part of the governorate (in the southwestern part of present-day Leningrad Oblast and in the northeastern part of Pskov Oblast).

Demographics
At the time of the Russian Empire Census of 1897, Luzhsky Uyezd had a population of 133,466. Of these, 91.7% spoke Russian, 3.6% Estonian, 1.3% Latvian, 0.8% Finnish, 0.7% Polish, 0.7% German, 0.5% Ingrian, 0.4% Yiddish, 0.1% Belarusian, 0.1% Romani and 0.1% Lithuanian as their native language.

References

 
1777 establishments in the Russian Empire
1927 disestablishments in Russia
Uezds of Saint Petersburg Governorate
History of Leningrad Oblast
History of Pskov Oblast